Ivan Volkanovski (born July 7, 1999) is a Macedonian professional basketball Center who plays for KK Rabotnički.

Professional career
On August 12, 2019, he signed a contract with MZT Skopje.

References

External links
 Eurobasket Profile
 Proballers Profile

1999 births
Living people
Macedonian men's basketball players
Centers (basketball)
KK MZT Skopje players